La Grande River (both meaning "great river") is a river in northwestern Quebec, Canada, which rises in the highlands of north central Quebec and flows roughly  west to drain into James Bay. It is the second largest river in Quebec, surpassed only by the Saint Lawrence River.

In November 2009, the Rupert River was also partially diverted, adding another  to the basin.

At one time, this river was known as the "Fort George River". The Hudson's Bay Company operated a trading post on the river at Big River House from 1803 to 1824. In 1837, a large trading post was established at Fort George on an island at the mouth of the river. In the early 20th century, this trading post became a village as the Crees of the James Bay region abandoned their nomadic way of life and settled nearby. The modern Cree village of Chisasibi, which replaced Fort George in 1980, is situated on the southern shore of the La Grande River, several kilometers to the East.

Tributaries
Significant tributaries of La Grande River include:
Kanaaupscow River
Sakami River
Eastmain River (diverted)
Opinaca River
Rupert River (diverted)
Rivière de Pontois
Rivière de la Corvette
Laforge River
Caniapiscau River (diverted)

Hydro-electric development
The river has been extensively developed as a source of hydroelectric power by Hydro-Québec, starting in 1974. The following generating stations are on the La Grande River and its tributaries in upstream order:
La-Grande-1 (LG-1)
Robert-Bourassa
La Grande-2A (LG-2A)
La Grande-3 (LG-3)
La Grande-4 (LG-4)
Laforge-1 (LF-1)
Laforge-2 (LF-2)
Brisay
Eastmain-1

As a result of the development projects, the Cree people of the region lost some parts of their traditional hunting and trapping territories (about 10% of the hunting and trapping territories used by the Cree of Chisasibi). Organic mercury levels increased in the fish, which forms an important part of their diet, as the organic material trapped by the rising waters in the new reservoirs began to filter into the food chain. Careful follow-up by Cree health authorities since the 1980s has been largely successful.  The authorities continue to promote the regular consumption of fish, with the notable exception of the predatory species living in the reservoirs, which still show high levels of mercury.

Climate

See also
James Bay Project
List of longest rivers of Canada

References

External links

Hydro-Québec's La Grande Complex
The Grand River at LG-1 (YouTube Video)

Rivers of Nord-du-Québec
James Bay Project
Tributaries of James Bay